Calabaceira is a village in the southern part of the island of Santiago, Cape Verde. It is part of the municipality Ribeira Grande de Santiago. In 2010 its population was 366. It is located on the eastern edge of the Ribeira Grande gorge, 2 km northeast of Cidade Velha and 10 km west of the capital Praia.

References

Ribeira Grande de Santiago
Villages and settlements in Santiago, Cape Verde